
Year 270 BC was a year of the pre-Julian Roman calendar. At the time it was known as the Year of the Consulship of Clepsina and Blasio (or, less frequently, year 484 Ab urbe condita). The denomination 270 BC for this year has been used since the early medieval period, when the Anno Domini calendar era became the prevalent method in Europe for naming years.

Events 
 By place 

 Roman Republic 
 Rome's subjugation of Italy is completed by the recapture of Rhegium (southern Italy) from the Mamertines and the defeat of the Brutians, the Lucanians, the Calabrians and the Samnites. The town of Rhegium is then restored by the Romans to its Greek inhabitants.

 Carthage 
 Carthage, already in control of Sardinia, southern Spain and Numidia, is ruled by an oligarchy of merchants under two Suffetes or chief magistrates. While Carthage's military commanders are strong, the state relies on mercenaries (including Spanish ones) for its soldiers.

Births 
 Hamilcar Barca, founder of Barcid Spain and leading Carthaginian general who will fight against Rome in Sicily and Italy, against the Libyans and the mercenary revolt in Africa, and against the Iberians and Celti-Iberians in Spain (d. 228 BC)

Deaths 
 Arsinoe II, queen to Lysimachus, the king of Thrace, and later wife of her brother, King Ptolemy II Philadelphus of Egypt (b. c. 316 BC)
 Epicurus, Greek philosopher, author of an ethical philosophy of simple pleasure, friendship, and retirement (b. 341 BC)
 Marcus Valerius Corvus, Roman hero (b. c. 370 BC)
 Manius Curius Dentatus, Roman general, conqueror of the Samnites and victor against Pyrrhus, King of Epirus
 Pyrrho, Greek philosopher from Elis, credited as being the first skeptic philosopher and inspiration for the school known as Pyrrhonism (b. c. 360 BC) 
 Euclid of Alexandria, Mathematician, considered the "father of geometry", chiefly known for the Elements treatise, which established the foundations of geometry, has been estimated to die in 270 BC

References